Death of a Delft Blue is a 1964 mystery detective novel by the British writer Gladys Mitchell. It is the thirty seventh in the long-running series of books featuring Mitchell's best known character, the psychoanalyst and amateur detective Mrs Bradley.

Synopsis
While attending a conference in the Netherlands, Mrs Bradley encounters an eccentric Dutch family including a young woman under pressure to marry her cousin, to the outrage of her handsome brother Florian. While Florian is sitting for a portrait commissioned by his aunt in which he is holding a delft blue object, he disappears. He subsequently reappears in the British Peak District in North Derbyshire. Shortly afterwards to local barmaids die after eating poisoned chocolates which may have been intended for Florian.

References

Bibliography
 Reilly, John M. Twentieth Century Crime & Mystery Writers. Springer, 2015.

1964 British novels
Novels by Gladys Mitchell
British crime novels
British mystery novels
British thriller novels
Novels set in Amsterdam
Novels set in Derbyshire
British detective novels
Michael Joseph books